The Liberation Tour is a co-headlining concert tour by American recording artists, Mary J. Blige and D'Angelo. The North America tour supports Blige's tenth studio album, My Life II... The Journey Continues (Act 1) (2011) and D'Angelo's third studio album, Black Messiah (2014). The tour also features special guest Melanie Fiona.

Background
On July 7, 2012, Mary J. Blige headlined the Essence Music Festival in New Orleans, during a brief interview with Rolling Stone she announced an upcoming 20 date summer tour with singer D'Angelo. Blige stated: "I felt like it would be refreshing and fun for people to see him and Mary J. Blige on the road together." 

Tickets for four shows went on sale a few days after. During a four night stint at Caesars in Atlantic City (June 29, 30 & July 3, 4), Blige gave fans a peek of what was to come on the tour.

The tour will feature supporting act Melanie Fiona, and include Starshell appearing only at select cities. The Liberation Tour will extend its run in the summer of 2013 with R&B singer Bridget Kelly opening for D'Angelo and Blige. During the tour Vibe news announced a VIP contest giveaway to win two pair of tickets to any city of choice to see the tour. During the tour, VIP Nation also offered fans VIP Packages for the tour.

Opening acts
 Melanie Fiona (2012)
 Starshell (2012 select dates)
 Bridget Kelly (2013)

Set list

Additional notes
 Blige performed "Mary Jane (All Night Long)" only in Washington, D.C. replacing "Midnight Drive".
 "Why" was cut from Blige's setlist at some shows.
 D'Angelo's setlist was changed often for selected dates during the tour.
 "Brown Sugar" was his opening song at the Los Angeles show, and at select cities.

Tour dates

References

External links
Mary J Blige & D'Angelo Tour

2012 concert tours
2013 concert tours
Mary J. Blige concert tours
D'Angelo concert tours